Casalmorano is a comune (municipality) in the Province of Cremona in the Italian region Lombardy, located about  southeast of Milan and about  northwest of Cremona.

Casalmorano borders the following municipalities: Annicco, Azzanello, Casalbuttano ed Uniti, Castelvisconti, Genivolta, Paderno Ponchielli, Soresina.

References

Cities and towns in Lombardy